Maxwell Anikwenwa  was an Anglican bishop in Nigeria.

Anikwenwa was born in Oyi in 1940; and educated at Trinity Theological College, Umuahia. He  was ordained Deacon in  1964 and Priest in December 1966.
He served in Onitsha and Freetown. He was elected, consecrated, and enthroned as the first Bishop of Awka in 1987; and   Archbishop of the Niger in 2000.

He was also Dean of the Church of Nigeria.

He retired as Bishop of Awka, Archbishop of the Niger and Dean of the Church on 22 November 2010.
He died on Monday, 13th of March 2023.

Notes

Living people
Anglican bishops of Awka
Anglican archbishops of the Niger
People from Kaduna
21st-century Anglican archbishops
20th-century Anglican bishops in Nigeria
People from Anambra State
Trinity Theological College, Umuahia alumni
1940 births
Deans of the Church of Nigeria